Karl Wilhelm Ferdinand Solger (28 November 1780, Schwedt – 20 October 1819, Berlin) was a German philosopher and academic. He is known as a theorist of Romanticism, and of irony.

Biography
Solger's extensive studies included attending Friedrich Wilhelm Joseph Schelling's Darstellung meines Systems der Philosophie [Presentation of My System of Philosophy] lectures at the University of Jena in 1800–01 and Johann Gottlieb Fichte's "Wissenschaftslehre" lectures in Berlin 1804. In 1811, Solger became professor of philosophy at the University of Berlin

Works
 Des Sophokles Tragödien [Sophocles' Tragedies] (2 vols., 1808; 2d ed., 1824)
 Erwin, Vier Gespräche über das Schöne und die Kunst [Erwin, or Four Dialogues on Beauty and Art] (2 vols., 1815) [A work on aesthetics, in which he took issue with August Wilhelm Schlegel, and which influenced both Hegel and Heinrich Heine.]
 Philosophische Gespräche [Philosophical Dialogues] (1817)
 Solger's nachgelassene Schriften und Briefwechsel [Posthumous writings and letters], edited by Tieck and Raumer (2 vols., 1826)
 K. W. F. Solger’s Vorlesungen über Aesthetik [Lectures in Aesthetics], edited by Heyse (1829)

Notes

References
 

1780 births
1819 deaths
German philosophers
People from the Margraviate of Brandenburg
Academic staff of European University Viadrina
Academic staff of the Humboldt University of Berlin
German male writers